The 2010 AC St. Louis season was the club's first and last season of professional soccer. The Saints in the NASL Conference of the USSF D2 Pro League, the second tier of the American Soccer Pyramid. The league was a temporary professional soccer league created by the United States Soccer Federation (USSF) in 2010 to last just one season, as a compromise between the feuding United Soccer Leagues (USL) and the North American Soccer League (NASL).

St. Louis played their home games at the Anheuser-Busch Center in nearby Fenton, Missouri. The team's colors are green, white and yellow. The team began the season coached by Claude Anelka, the older brother of French international striker Nicolas Anelka, but Dale Schilly replaced Anelka as head coach 24 June 2010.

Preseason
On March 19, 2010, AC St. Louis and the Kansas City Wizards started what is expected to be an annual rivalry series of 2 games between the cross-state rivals. The March 19th game was played in Kansas City with the 2nd in St. Louis, Missouri. The wizards won the first game 2-0. The winner will be decided on aggregate score.

USSF 2
AC St. Louis kicked off their season April 10 at the Carolina Railhawks.

Results

Players

Current roster

Staff
  Dale Schilly Head Coach
  John Vanbuskirk Assistant Coach
  Tim Leonard Assistant Coach
  Blake Decker Assistant Coach
  Tim Owens General Manager
  Paul Rogers Goalkeeper Coach

Statistics

Overall
{|class="wikitable"
|-
|Games played || 25
|-
|Games won || 6
|-
|Games lost || 11
|-
|Games drawn || 8
|-
|Goals scored || 25 (1.00 per match)
|-
|Goals conceded || 34 (1.36 per match)
|-
|Goal difference || -9
|-
|Clean sheets || 7
|-
|Yellow cards || 30
|-
|Red cards || 4
|-
|Worst discipline ||  Jack Traynor ( 7 , 1 ) 
|-
|rowspan="2"|Best result(s) || 3-0 (H) v Montreal Impact - 10 July 2010
|-
|3-0 (H) v Portland Timbers - 28 July 2010
|-
|rowspan="3"|Worst result(s) || 0-3 (A) v Portland Timbers - 22 April 2010
|-
|0-3 (H) v FC Tampa Bay - 22 May 2010
|-
|0-3 (A) v Montreal Impact - 21 July 2010
|-
|Most appearances || Mark Bloom and Alec Dufty with 24 appearances
|-
|Top scorer ||  Mike Ambersley (9 goals)
|-
|Top assistant ||  Luke Kreamalmeyer (5 assists)
|-
|Points || 26/75 (34.7%)
|-

Top scorers
Includes all competitive matches. The list is sorted by shirt number when total goals are equal.

{| class="wikitable" style="font-size: 95%; text-align: center;"
|-
!width=60|Position
!width=60|Nation
!width=60|Number
!width=150|Name
!width=80|USSF Division 2
!width=80|U.S. Open Cup
!width=80|Total
|-
|1
|
|15
|Mike Ambersley
|9
|2
|11
|-
|2
|
|7
|Luke Kreamalmeyer
|4
|0
|4
|-
| 
|
|11
|Chris Salvaggione
|2
|0
|2
|-
| 
|
|17
|Brad Stisser
|2
|0
|2
|-
| 
|
|20
|Jeff Cosgriff
|2
|0
|2
|-
|3
|
|8
|Anthony O'Garro
|1
|0
|1
|-
| 
|
|13
|Gauchinho
|1
|0
|1
|-
| 
|
|19
|Manuel Kante†
|1
|0
|1
|-
| 
|
|21
|Mark Bloom
|1
|0
|1
|-

† = Player is no longer with the club but still scored a goal during the season.

References

AC St. Louis
AC St. Louis
USSF Division 2 Professional League
2010 in sports in Missouri